The Comptroller General of the Union (abbreviated CGU), is a branch of the Brazilian federal government tasked with assisting the president regarding the treasury and public assets and the government's transparency policies. These tasks are carried out by way of public audits, fraud deterrence procedures, and other sort of internal control, corruption prevention, and ombudsman activities. It is also the central body of the Federal Government Internal Control System, responsible for supervising, managing and regulating the offices of the government. 

The Chief Minister of the Comptroller General of the Union is appointed by the president and serves as a member of the Brazilian cabinet. The branch was created by the former president Fernando Henrique Cardoso and its first minister-inspector was the jurist Anadyr de Mendonça Rodrigues. In 2003, its name was changed and, in 2016, it was transformed into the Ministry of Transparency, Inspection and Comptroller General of the Union, with the same attributions and added the attributions of control and transparency. During Jair Bolsonaro's presidency, the branch was once again named as Comptroller General of the Union.

See also
 Other Comptroller

References

External links
 Official site 

Executive branch of Brazil
Government ministries of Brazil